Barbara Hoffe was a British stage actress. She also appeared in six silent films and one early sound film.

Filmography
 It's Always the Woman (1916)
 Five Pounds Reward (1920)
 The Marriage Lines (1921)
 Belonging (1922)
 Lieutenant Daring RN and the Water Rats (1924)
 Eugene Aram (1924)
 The Woman Between (1931)

References

Bibliography
 J. P. Wearing. The London Stage 1920-1929: A Calendar of Productions, Performers, and Personnel. Rowman & Littlefield, 2014.

External links

Year of birth unknown
Year of death unknown
British stage actresses
British film actresses